Verticordia spicata, commonly known as spiked featherflower, is a flowering plant in the myrtle family, Myrtaceae and is endemic to the south-west of Western Australia. It is usually a dense, bushy shrub with small leaves pressed against the stem and spikes of pink flowers from late spring to early summer.

Description
The leaves are densely arranged along the branches, mostly closely clasping the stem. The leaves are broadly egg-shaped,  with prominent oil glands and have narrow, translucent and slightly hairy margins.

Flowering time is from October to January.

Taxonomy and naming
Verticordia spicata was first formally described in 1859 by Ferdinand von Mueller from a specimen collected near the Murchison River by Augustus Oldfield. Mueller published the description in Fragmenta phytographiae Australiae. The specific epithet (spicata) is derived from the Latin word spica meaning "spike".

When Alex George reviewed the genus in 1991, he placed this species in subgenus Eperephes, section Verticordella along with V. halophila, V. blepharophylla, V. lindleyi, V. carinata, V. attenuata, V. drummondii, V. wonganensis, V. paludosa, V. luteola, V. bifimbriata, V. tumida, V. mitodes, V. centipeda, V. auriculata, V. pholidophylla, V. pennigera and V. hughanii.

George also described two subspecies:

Distribution and habitat
Spiked featherflower occurs between the Cooloomia Nature Reserve near the Murchison River Kalbarri National Park, Northampton and Mullewa in the Avon Wheatbelt, Carnarvon, Geraldton Sandplains and Yalgoobiogeographic regions. Scaly-leaved featherflower is confined to the eastern part of the range, between  Three Springs and Morawa.  Both subspecies grow in sandy soil, often over granite or sandstone in heath or shrubland.

Conservation
Verticordia spicata subsp. spicata is classified as "not threatened" by the Western Australian Government Department of Parks and Wildlife but subspecies squasosa is classified as "Threatened Flora (Declared Rare Flora — Extant)" and an Interim Recovery Plan has been prepared. It has also been listed as "Endangered" (EN) under the Australian Government Environment Protection and Biodiversity Conservation Act 1999 (EPBC Act).

Use in horticulture
Propagation of both species has proven to be difficult, especially of subspecies squamosa. Subspecies spicata has been grown from cuttings, seed and by grafting onto Darwinia citriodora rootstock. Mature shrubs have been ornamental and sometimes survived for 14 years.

References

spicata
Plants described in 1859
Rosids of Western Australia
Eudicots of Western Australia
Plants described in 1837
Taxa named by Ferdinand von Mueller